Chaand Kaa Tukdaa is a 1994 Indian Hindi-language film produced and directed by Saawan Kumar Tak starring Sridevi, Salman Khan and Shatrughan Sinha.

Plot 
Shyam lives a wealthy lifestyle in London, England, and is considered one of the ten richest people in the world. His father, S.K. Malhotra, was killed, and his mother identified his killer, but before this person could be apprehended, she, herself passes away, but not before asking Shyam to return to India and marry a beautiful girl. Shyam does return to India, and once there does meet the girl, Radha, of his dreams, but does not know that Radha is a mere pawn in the hands of a group of people, including his father's killer, who are after his wealth and estate, and will do anything in their power to obtain it.

Cast 

Salman Khan as Shyam Malhotra
Sridevi as Radha Malhotra
Shatrughan Sinha as SP Shatrughan Sinha / Zevago
Anupam Kher as Hasmukh Khurana
Raza Murad as Sohan Singh
Mehmood as Babumashay
Rakesh Hans as Rakesh H. Khurana
Zeba Khan as Minoo
Rama Vij as Mrs. Malhotra
Faiyyaz
Raviraaj
Gurbachan Singh as Babbar
Lalit Tiwari as Raja Saheb
Guddi Maruti as Babu's eldest daughter
Anil Nagrath as Cooper (doctor)
Sahila Chadha – Special appearance in "Aaja Dewaane"

Production 
Recalling his pairing with Sridevi, actor Salman Khan said, he was scared to share the screen space with the actress, as she was capable of making the audience concentrate on herself, neglecting her co-stars.

Soundtrack

References

External links 
 

1990s Hindi-language films
1994 films
Films directed by Saawan Kumar Tak